John Harry Vandermeer (born 1940) is an American ecologist, a mathematical ecologist, tropical ecologist and agroecologist. He is the Asa Gray Distinguished University Professor of Ecology and Evolutionary Biology and the Arthur F. Thurnau Professor at the University of Michigan, where he has taught since 1971. His research focuses on the ecology of agricultural systems, and he has operated a plot of coffee plants in Mexico for his research for more than fifteen years. In 2016, the symposium "Science with Passion and a Moral Compass" was held to honor his career as a scientist and activist. The symposium, also known as VandyFest, was held in Ann Arbor, Michigan from May 6 to May 8.

Early life and education
Vandermeer was born in 1940 in Chicago, Illinois. He was educated at the University of Illinois, the University of Kansas, and the University of Michigan.

Vandermeer  has conducted field research mainly in Mexico, Puerto Rico, Costa Rica, Nicaragua and Guatemala. His research has focused on the dynamics of spatially explicit biological interactions in coffee farms in Mexico.

His long-term collaboration with a multi-national team of scientists focused on tropical rainforest dynamics after major hurricane disturbance in Nicaragua. Their research provides strong evidence in favor of the assertion that it is the chance to reach a recruitment space into the forest canopy that governs the maintenance of hundreds of tree species and to some lesser extent the multiple tree species competition for nutrients and light. This diverges from tropical tree species niche identity notion thus proposing that the tree species assemblage are to some extent the result of random dispersal and recruitment events.

Vandermeer and his colleagues Dr. Ivette Perfecto, Dr. Douglas Boucher and Dr. Inigo Granzow de la Cerda contributed to the groundwork that evolved into the university system in the Autonomous Regions of the Atlantic Coast of Nicaragua.

References

External links
Faculty

1940 births
Living people
American ecologists
University of Michigan faculty
University of Michigan alumni
University of Illinois alumni
Scientists from Chicago
University of Kansas alumni